Festuca breviglumis is a species of grass in the family Poaceae. The name was published in 1950 in the US.

Habitat
Festuca breviglemis grows mainly in subtropical biomes and is native to Costa Rica, Guatemala, Mexico, and Panamá.

Characteristics
Fesctua breviglemis is a perennial plant with culms erect ascending from 60 - 130 centimeters long and glumes that are shorter then its spikelets.

Etymology
The specific name breviglemis came from the words 'breviter' and 'glumae' together meaning 'short glumes'.

References

breviglumis
Grasses of Mexico